Borgarhreppur was formerly a rural parish (hreppur) in Mýrasýsla county, west Iceland, named after the ancient farm and church estate Borg á Mýrum which was occupied by Skallagrímur Kveldúlfsson, one of Iceland's original settlers.

On 7 June 1998 Borgarhreppur joined the Borgarbyggð municipality, along with Álftaneshreppur and Þverárhlíðarhreppur.

Populated places in Iceland